Santiago Ramón y Cajal (1 May 1852 – 17 October 1934) was a Spanish neuroscientist, pathologist, and histologist specializing in neuroanatomy and the central nervous system. He and Camillo Golgi received the Nobel Prize in Physiology or Medicine in 1906. Ramón y Cajal was the first person of Spanish origin to win a scientific Nobel Prize. His original investigations of the microscopic structure of the brain made him a pioneer of modern neuroscience.

Hundreds of his drawings illustrating the arborizations ("tree growing") of brain cells are still in use, since the mid-20th century, for educational and training purposes.

Biography
Santiago Ramón y Cajal was born on the 1st of May 1852 in the town of Petilla de Aragón, Navarre, Spain. As a child he was transferred many times from one school to another because of behavior that was declared poor, rebellious, and showing an anti-authoritarian attitude. An extreme example of his precociousness and rebelliousness at the age of eleven is his 1863 imprisonment for destroying his neighbor's yard gate with a homemade cannon. He was a keen painter, artist, and gymnast, but his father neither appreciated nor encouraged these abilities, even though these artistic talents would contribute to his success later in life. His father apprenticed him to a shoemaker and barber, to "try and give his son much-needed discipline and stability."

Over the summer of 1868, his father took him to graveyards to find human remains for anatomical study. Early sketches of bones moved him to pursue medical studies. Ramón y Cajal attended the medical school of the University of Zaragoza, where his father worked as an anatomy teacher. He graduated in 1873, aged 21, and then served as a medical officer in the Spanish Army. He took part in an expedition to Cuba in 1874–1875, where he contracted malaria and tuberculosis. To aid his recovery, Ramón y Cajal spent time in the spa-town Panticosa in the Pyrenees mountain range.

After returning to Spain, he received his doctorate in medicine in Madrid in 1877. Two years later, he became the director of the Zaragoza Museum, and he married Silveria Fañanás García, with whom he had seven daughters and five sons. Ramón y Cajal worked at the University of Zaragoza until 1883, when he was awarded the position of anatomy professor of the University of Valencia.  His early work at these two universities focused on the pathology of inflammation, the microbiology of cholera, and the structure of epithelial cells and tissues.

In 1887 Ramón y Cajal moved to Barcelona for a professorship. There he first learned about Golgi's method, a cell staining method which uses potassium dichromate and silver nitrate to (randomly) stain a few neurons a dark black color, while leaving the surrounding cells transparent. This method, which he improved, was central to his work, allowing him to turn his attention to the central nervous system (brain and spinal cord), in which neurons are so densely intertwined that standard microscopic inspection would be nearly impossible. During this period he made extensive detailed drawings of neural material, covering many species and most major regions of the brain.

In 1892, he became professor at Madrid.

He died in Madrid on October 17, 1934, at the age of 82, continuing to work even on his deathbed.

Political and religious views
In 1877, the 25-year-old Ramón y Cajal joined a Masonic lodge. John Brande Trend wrote in 1965 that Ramón y Cajal "was a liberal in politics, an evolutionist in philosophy, an agnostic in religion".
 
Nonetheless, Ramón y Cajal used the term soul "without any shame". He was said to later have regretted having left organized religion. Ultimately, he became convinced of a belief in God as a creator, as stated during his first lecture before the Spanish Royal Academy of Sciences.

Discoveries and theories

Ramón y Cajal made several major contributions to neuroanatomy. He discovered the axonal growth cone, and demonstrated experimentally that the relationship between nerve cells was not continuous, or a single system as per then extant reticular theory, but rather contiguous; there were gaps between neurons. This provided definitive evidence for what Heinrich Waldeyer would name "neuron theory", now widely considered the foundation of modern neuroscience. He is also considered by some to be the first "neuroscientist" since in 1894 he stated to the Royal Society of London: "The ability of neurons to grow in an adult and their power to create new connections can explain learning." This statement is considered to be the origin of the synaptic theory of memory.

He was an advocate of the existence of dendritic spines, although he did not recognize them as the site of contact from presynaptic cells. He was a proponent of polarization of nerve cell function and his student, Rafael Lorente de Nó, would continue this study of input-output systems into cable theory and some of the earliest circuit analysis of neural structures.

By producing excellent depictions of neural structures and their connectivity and providing detailed descriptions of cell types he discovered a new type of cell, which was subsequently named after him, the interstitial cell of Cajal (ICC). This cell is found interleaved among neurons embedded within the smooth muscles lining the gut, serving as the generator and pacemaker of the slow waves of contraction which move material along the gastrointestinal tract, mediating neurotransmission from motor neurons to smooth muscle cells.

In his 1894 Croonian Lecture, Ramón y Cajal suggested (in an extended metaphor) that cortical pyramidal cells may become more elaborate with time, as a tree grows and extends its branches.

He devoted a considerable amount of time studying French  which he used to help his wife during labor and parapsychological phenomena. A book he had written on these topics was lost during the Spanish Civil War.

Distinctions

Ramón y Cajal received many prizes, distinctions, and societal memberships during his scientific career, including honorary doctorates in medicine from Cambridge University and Würzburg University and an honorary doctorate in philosophy from Clark University. The most famous distinction he was awarded was the Nobel Prize in Physiology or Medicine in 1906, together with the Italian scientist Camillo Golgi "in recognition of their work on the structure of the nervous system". This caused some controversy because Golgi, a staunch supporter of reticular theory, disagreed with Ramón y Cajal in his view of the neuron doctrine. Even before Ramón y Cajal's work, Norwegian scientist Fridtjof Nansen established the contiguous nature of nerve cells in his study of certain marine life, which Ramón y Cajal failed to cite.

In society and culture
In 1906 Joaquin Sorolla y Bastida painted Cajal's official portrait celebrating his Nobel Prize win.

Cajal posed for a statue that was created by the sculptor Mariano Benlliure and was installed 1924 in the Paraninfo building at the School of Medicine of the University of Zaragoza.

In 1931 a monument was unveiled in Madrid, Spain. This full-body statue that stands 3 m (around 10 ft) high on a narrow pedestal and created by Lorenzo Domínguez, a Chilean medical student.

1982 a TV mini series was created in Spain titled Ramón y Cajal: Historia de una voluntad.

In 2003, the first major exhibition of Cajal's scientific drawings opened in Madrid, Spain.  The exhibition featured hundreds of restored original drawings, micrographic slides, and personal photographs created by Cajal.  The accompanying catalog titled Santiago Ramon y Cajal (1852–2003) Ciencia y Arte features numerous high quality reproductions of Cajal's drawings and photo essays on the restoration process.  Exhibition curators and contributing authors to the catalog include:  Santiago Ramón y Cajal Junquera, Miguel Ángel Freire Mallo, Paloma Esteban Leal, Pablo García, Virginia G. Marin, Ma Cruz Osuna, Isabel Argerich Fernández, Paloma Calle, Marta C. Lopera, Ricardo Martínez, Pilar Sedano Espín, Eugenia Gimeno Pascual, Sonia Tortajada, and Juan Antonio Sáez Dégano.

In 2005 the asteroid 117413 Ramonycajal was named after him by Juan Lacruz.

In 2007, sculptures of Severo Ochoa y Santiago Ramón y Cajal created Víctor Ochoa were unveiled at the Spain's CESIC (university research centre), Madrid, Spain.

Santiago Ramón y Cajal Museum, Ayerbe, Huesca, Spain opened in 2013 and is located in Cajal's childhood home, where he lived with his family for ten years.

In 2014, the National Institutes of Health Bethesda, MD, US, initiated an ongoing exhibition of original Ramón y Cajal drawings in its John Porter Neuroscience Research Center.  The exhibition concept was spearheaded by NINDS Senior Researcher Jeffery Diamond and NINDS science writer Christopher Thomas and was made possible through close collaboration with the Instituto Cajal, Madrid, Spain. The exhibition also includes contemporary artwork curated by Jeff Diamond, which was created by artists Rebecca Kamen and Dawn Hunter.  Inspired by Cajal's original drawings, Kamen's and Hunter's artworks are thematically representative of Cajal's aesthetic and are on permanent display for the public at the John Porter Neuroscience Research Center.  Through the award of a 2017–2018 Fulbright España Senior Research Fellowship to the Instituto Cajal, Madrid, Spain, Hunter continued to develop her creative project about Cajal by referencing original source material.

A selection of Cajal's scientific drawings, personal photos, oil paintings, and pastel drawings were curated into the 14th Istanbul Biennial, Saltwater, that was held in Istanbul, Turkey from September 5 – November 1, 2015.

The exhibition Fisiología de los Sueños. Cajal, Tanguy, Lorca, Dalí... opened on October 5, 2015, and ended on January 16, 2016, at the University of Zaragoza, Zaragoza, Spain.  Cajal's work was the centerpiece topic of the exhibition and the show explored the influence of histological drawings on Surrealism.

From January 31 – May 29, 2016, Cajal's work was featured in the inaugural exhibition for the re-opening of University of California's Berkeley Art Museum and Pacific Film Archive (BAMPFA) Architecture of Life.  The catalog for the exhibition featured Cajal's drawing of the Purkinje Cell on the front cover.

The National Institutes of Health, Bethesda, MD, USA and the Instituto Cajal, Madrid, Spain held collaborative symposiums honoring Cajal. The collaborative institutional symposiums were held on October 28, 2015, and May 24, 2017.  The first symposium held at the NIH in 2015 was titled Bridging the Legacy of Santiago Ramón y Cajal, a symposium honoring the father of modern neuroscience.  Keynote speaker Dr. Rafael Yuste was honored at a reception held at the Spanish Ambassador's, Ramón Gil-Casares, home.  The second symposium titled, New Opportunities for NIH-CSIC Collaboration, was held at the Instituto Cajal in 2017.  Dawn Hunter's Cajal Inventory art project was exhibited at the symposium for the general public in the institute's library.  The Cajal Inventory consists of forty-five 11” x 14” drawings in which Hunter recreated in fine detail Cajal's scientific drawings from primary source, and surreal portrait drawings of Cajal inspired by his photography.

Every year more than two hundred four-year postdoctoral fellowships by the Ministry of Science of Spain are awarded to middle career scholars from different fields of knowledge are called "Ayudas a contratos Ramon y Cajal" to honor his memory.

An exhibition called The Beautiful Brain: The Drawings of Santiago Ramón y Cajal travelled through North America, beginning 2017 in the US at the Weisman Art Museum in Minneapolis, Minnesota.  The exhibition traveled to the Morris and Helen Belkin Art Gallery, University of British Columbia, Vancouver, British Columbia, Canada, Grey Art Gallery, New York University, New York City, New York, USA, MIT Museum, Massachusetts Institute of Technology Cambridge, Massachusetts, USA, and ended in April 2019 at the Ackland Art Museum in Chapel Hill, North Carolina, USA.  The Beautiful Brain book, published by Abrams, New York, accompanied the exhibition.

During 2019, the University of Zaragoza, Zaragoza, Spain opened an exhibition about Cajal titled Santiago Ramón y Cajal. 150 years at the University of Zaragoza.  The exhibition had an accompanying catalog that featured the same title. The exhibition opened October 2019 and closed at the end of December 2019.

A short documentary by REDES is available on YouTube. Spanish public television channel RTVE screened a biopic series to commemorate his life in 2019.

From the 19th of November, 2020 through the 5th of December 2021, the National Museum of Natural Sciences, Madrid, Spain hosted an exhibition featuring Cajal's scientific drawings, photographs, scientific equipment and personal objects from the Legado Cajal, Instituto Cajal, Madrid, Spain.

In 2020, over 75 volunteers collaborated as part of The Cajal Embroidery Project across 6 countries to create 81 intricate, exquisite hand-stitched panels of Ramón y Cajal's images, which were then curated and displayed by Edinburgh Neuroscience at the virtual FENS 2020 Forum, and showcased by The Lancet Neurology in their front covers in 2021.

In 2017, UNESCO (the United Nations Educational, Scientific and Cultural Organization) recognised Cajal's Legacy (which had been kept in a museum from 1945 to 1989) as a World Heritage treasure. Recognising that this cultural treasure deserves a dedicated museum, showcasing not only Cajal's but also his disciples’ legacies, there has been a call for a dedicated museum to commemorate and celebrate Ramón y Cajal's discoveries and impact on neuroscience.

Project Encephalon organised Cajal Week to celebrate his 169th birth anniversary from 1 May to 7 May 2021.

The Brain In Search Of Itself, an English language biography, was published in 2022.

Publications
He published more than 100 scientific works and articles in Spanish, French and German. Among his works were:
 Rules and advice on scientific investigation
 Histology
 Degeneration and regeneration of the nervous system
 Manual of normal histology and micrographic technique
 Elements of histology

A list of his books includes:

{{cite book|author=Ramón y Cajal, Santiago|author2=L. Azoulay|year=1894|publisher=C. Reinwald|title=Les nouvelles idées sur la structure du système nerveux chez l'homme et chez les vertébrés' ('New ideas on the fine anatomy of the nerve centres).|language=fr|url=https://archive.org/details/lesnouvellesid00ram}}

In 1905, he published five science-fiction stories called "Vacation Stories" under the pen name "Dr. Bacteria".

Gallery of drawings

See also

 List of pathologists

Notes

References

Further reading
 Wilkinson, Alec, "Illuminating the Brain's 'Utter Darkness'" (review of Benjamin Ehrlich, The Brain in Search of Itself: Santiago Ramón y Cajal and the Story of the Neuron, Farrar, Straus and Giroux, 2023, 447 pp.; and Timothy J. Jorgensen, Spark: The Life of Electricity and the Electricity of Life, Princeton University Press, 2021, 436 pp.), The New York Review of Books, vol. LXX, no. 2 (February 9, 2023), pp. 32, 34–35.

External links

  (Review of the work of the 1906 Nobel Prize in Physiology or Medicine winners Camillo Golgi and Santiago Ramón y Cajal)
  including the Nobel Lecture on December 12, 1906 The Structure and Connexions of Neurons''
 Marina Bentivoglio Life and discoveries of Cajal Nobel Prizes and Laureates, 20 April 1998
 Cajal's Láminas ilustrativas Centro Virtual Cervantes
 Javier de Felipe Brief overview of Ramón y Cajal's career www.psu.edu The Pennsylvania State University, 1998
 

1852 births
1934 deaths
People from Navarre
Former atheists and agnostics
20th-century Spanish physicians
19th-century Spanish physicians
Spanish neuroscientists
History of neuroscience
Nobel laureates in Physiology or Medicine
Spanish Nobel laureates
Spanish pathologists
Spanish anatomists
Spanish scientists
Spanish military doctors
Histologists
Spanish Freemasons
Members of the Royal Spanish Academy
Complutense University of Madrid
Complutense University of Madrid alumni
Foreign Members of the Royal Society
Foreign associates of the National Academy of Sciences
Recipients of the Pour le Mérite (civil class)
University of Zaragoza alumni